The Hand and the Sword is Dominion III's debut album.

Track listing 
 "Apocalyptic Views"
 "The Angel's Delusion"
 "The Hand and the Sword"
 "Immortal Reign"
 "The Machine's Dream"
 "Corona of the Sun"
 "Transmitting..."
 "With the Strength of Aeons"
 "Tempus Fugit"

Credits 
All music by Tharen except female vocals by Elizabeth Toriser and guitar on "The Angel's Delusion" by Jörg Lanz. Layout concept and realization by Tharen. The Hand and the Sword was programmed in Stronghold Dominion. Recorded, mixed and mastered by Georg Hrauda and Tharen in the year of 1999 in Tonstudio Hoernix. "The Angel's Delusion" inspired by the movie "Angel Heart". -Dominion plays Apocalyptic Industrial Music exclusively-

2000 debut albums
Dominion III albums
Napalm Records albums